Hershel Anderson (born August 4, 1937) is an American former sports shooter. He competed at the 1972 Summer Olympics and the 1976 Summer Olympics.

References

1937 births
Living people
American male sport shooters
Olympic shooters of the United States
Shooters at the 1972 Summer Olympics
Shooters at the 1976 Summer Olympics
People from Tracy City, Tennessee
Sportspeople from Tennessee
Pan American Games medalists in shooting
Pan American Games gold medalists for the United States
Pan American Games silver medalists for the United States
Shooters at the 1967 Pan American Games
21st-century American people
20th-century American people